In Canada, a First Ministers' conference is a meeting of the provincial and territorial premiers and the Prime Minister.  These events are held at the call of the prime minister.  They are usually held in Ottawa.

Though known as "First Ministers' conferences" only since the 1960s, they ultimately trace their origin to the initial constitutional convention held in the mid-1860s at Charlottetown, PEI, then-capital of the British Province of Prince Edward Island.  After confederation, two conferences of provincial premiers were held, in 1887 and 1902, in which the federal government was not represented.

Altogether, 76 First Ministers' conferences have been held since the first was convened by Prime Minister Sir Wilfrid Laurier in 1906, at the request of the provinces.  Some important First Ministers' conferences were those leading up to the Meech Lake and Charlottetown Accords.  The failed Charlottetown Accord contained a provision that would have made annual First Ministers' conferences obligatory.

The conferences are important for a number of reasons.  A sizable portion of provincial funding (referred to as transfer payments) comes from the federal government, the conferences are an opportunity for the premiers to lobby for more money.  Today it is common for the Premiers to meet beforehand to present a common front to the federal government. They are also important in that Canada's federal system leaves a fair amount of overlap between federal and provincial jurisdictions and most large initiatives require some provincial support.

The vast majority of the activity at a First Ministers' conference takes place behind closed doors.  A public statement is issued after the conference.

Formerly, the government leaders of the territories were only occasionally invited to these conferences, depending on whether issues especially relevant to the north are being discussed. Today, these leaders normally attend the meetings. The national chief of the Assembly of First Nations may also be invited to attend when issues especially relevant to First Nations communities are on the agenda; the group has lobbied for greater inclusion.

List of First Ministers' conferences to date

 Source Canadian intergovernmental Conference Secretariat

See also
Council of Australian Governments, Similar body in Australia
Joint Ministerial Committee (UK), Similar body in the United Kingdom
National Governors Association, Similar body in the United States of America
 Canadian Constitution
 Council of the Federation
 Politics of Canada
 Political Culture of Canada

References

1906 establishments in Canada
Political terminology in Canada
Recurring events established in 1906
Political conferences
Deliberative groups
Federalism in Canada